The 2022 WAFF Women's Clubs Championship was the second edition of the WAFF Women's Clubs Championship, the West Asian women's club football championship organised by the WAFF.

Initially scheduled to be played from 10 to 20 December 2020, the tournament was postponed because of the COVID-19 pandemic. The tournament was then rescheduled to December 2021, before being finally moved to July 2022. It took place at the Prince Mohammed Stadium in Zarqa, Jordan.

Safa of Lebanon won their first title, after beating Orthodox of Jordan 3–1 in the final.

Teams
Four teams participated in the tournament. The draw was held on 3 July 2022, in Amman, Jordan. Abu Dhabi of the United Arab Emirates were due to participate, but withdrew on 14 July.

League table

Third place play-off

Final

Player awards
The following awards were given at the conclusion of the tournament:

Goalscorers

See also
 2022 AFC Women's Club Championship

References

External links
 

 
WAFF Women's Clubs Championship
2022 in women's association football
WAFF